Motor carrier may refer to:

 Motor carrier (designation), a company which employs large semi-truck and bus drivers
 Motor Carrier, an English automobile produced in 1904

See also
 Federal Motor Carrier Safety Administration, an agency of the United States Department of Transportation
 Motor Carrier Act (disambiguation)